The Clemenceau–Lloyd George Agreement of 1 December 1918 was a verbal agreement that modified the 1916 Sykes–Picot Agreement in respect to Palestine and the Mosul Vilayet. The latter component is also known as the Mosul Cession. The agreement was between British and French Prime Ministers David Lloyd George and Georges Clemenceau and took place at the French Embassy in London.

The agreement was controversial because France did not appear to have gained any substantial changes from Britain in return for the concessions of Mosul and Palestine.

John J McTague Jr wrote, "Despite the informality of this agreement, Lloyd George and Clemenceau held to it and it became the basis for legitimizing the British claim to Palestine".

The agreement was finalised in a meeting at Deauville in 1919.

See also
Mosul Question

Bibliography
 Fitzgerald, Edward Peter. "France's Middle Eastern Ambitions, the Sykes–Picot Negotiations, and the Oil Fields of Mosul." The Journal of Modern History 66.4 (1994): 697–725.

References

1918 in France
1918 in Ottoman Syria
1918 in the United Kingdom
Mandatory Palestine
Boundary treaties
France in World War I
France–United Kingdom treaties
Imperialism
Ottoman Empire in World War I
Clemenceau–Lloyd George Agreement
Sykes–Picot Agreement
Treaties concluded in 1918
Treaties involving territorial changes
Treaties of the French Third Republic
Treaties of the United Kingdom (1801–1922)
United Kingdom in World War I
World War I treaties
David Lloyd George
History of Mosul
Georges Clemenceau